Crazy Mary is a play by A.R. Gurney (The Dining Room; Mrs. Farnsworth; The Cocktail Hour) that had its world premiere at Playwrights Horizons in New York City from May 11-June 26, 2007, with actors Kristine Nielsen as Mary, Sigourney Weaver as Lydia and Michael Esper as Skip.  Scenic Design was by John Lee Beatty (The Color Purple; Chicago; Talley's Folly).  Costume Design was by Claudia Brown (Blue in the Face; Psych).  Lighting Design was by Brian Aldous (Mrs. Farnsworth; Blue Man Group: Tubes).  Sound Design was by Jill BC DuBoff.  Production Stage Manager was Janet Takami.  The play is directed by Jim Simpson (Mrs. Farnsworth; Psych) and took place on PH's Mainstage Theater. 

Crazy Mary concerns the scion of a wealthy Buffalo, New York clan and her willful, college-aged son who, in an attempt to account for the family inheritance, visit their long lost cousin Mary.  The catch:  Mary is living in an asylum, and has barely spoken in years, forcing mother and son to employ radical ends to get through. The play premiered on May 11, 2007 to sellout crowds, and the run was extended a week past its initial scheduled closure.

Reviews were lukewarm. The play has since been performed in community theaters in Florida and elsewhere.

Publication

Crazy Mary is published by Broadway Play Publishing Inc.

References

Plays by A. R. Gurney
Broadway plays
2007 plays